Faraid Head is a small peninsula on the northern coast of Sutherland, Highland, Scotland, located around  north of the hamlet of Balnakeil and  north of Durness.

At the point is located a small radar station built in the 1950s to house a ROTOR radar system to provide radar coverage of Scotland's north coast. By the time the facility was completed however the ROTOR system had become obsolete and the station was closed down but remained in the hands of the Ministry of Defence. In later years the main building was renovated as a control tower for the Cape Wrath and Garvie Island bombing ranges.

Extensive sand dunes can be found at Faraid Head which forms part of the Oldshoremore, Cape Wrath and Durness Special Landscape Area.

See also
Durness
Balnakeil
Cape Wrath

Further reading

References

Peninsulas of Scotland
Headlands of Scotland
Landforms of Sutherland
Landforms of Highland (council area)